Brandon Lewis Gibson (born August 13, 1987) is a former American football wide receiver. He played college football and basketball at Washington State and was drafted by the Philadelphia Eagles in the sixth round of the 2009 NFL Draft. He also played for the St. Louis Rams and Miami Dolphins.

Early years
Gibson grew up in Puyallup, Washington and went to Stahl Jr High School then graduated from Governor John R. Rogers High School in 2005.

College career
Gibson finished his college career at Washington State as the school's all-time leading receiver with 2,756 yards and 182 receptions along with 17 touchdowns. He also played for the Washington State basketball team during the 2005-06 season, but decided to focus his attention on football.

In 2007, as a junior, Gibson started 11 games and was named to Phil Steele's Third-team All-America. Also, he was voted First-team All-Pac-10 honors. He set the WSU single-season record for receiving yards in a season with 1,180 on 67 receptions. He also led the team with nine touchdowns, a tie for third most touchdowns in a single season by a WSU Cougar. In 2006, he played in 12 games with no starts. He led the Cougars with 731 yards and was second on the squad in both receptions (49) and touchdowns (four). As a freshman, he earned a varsity letter after playing in 10 of the Cougars' 11 games during his debut season. Gibson ended the season with 9 catches for 172 yards (19.2 yard average) and 2 touchdowns.

Gibson seriously considered leaving Washington State to declare for the 2008 NFL Draft due to the team switching coaches, however, the new coaching staff convinced him to stay.

As a senior in 2008, Gibson earned the fourth varsity letter of his career after starting in each of WSU's 13 games. He was named honorable mention All-Pacific-10 Conference and the team Offensive Most Valuable Player. In 2008, he caught 57 passes for 673 yards and two touchdowns. After the season, he received an invitation to play in the Senior Bowl.

Professional career

Pre-draft
Gibson pulled his hamstring during the 2009 Senior Bowl in Mobile, Alabama.

Philadelphia Eagles
Gibson was drafted by the Philadelphia Eagles in the sixth round of the 2009 NFL Draft. He signed a four-year deal with Philadelphia on June 6, 2009.

After being inactive through the first two games of the 2009 season, Gibson played in his first NFL game on September 27 against the Kansas City Chiefs.

St. Louis Rams
Gibson was traded from Philadelphia to the St. Louis Rams on October 20, 2009 along with a fifth round draft pick in 2010 in exchange for linebacker Will Witherspoon. In his Ram debut, on November 15, 2009, he caught 7 passes for 93 yards, both Ram records for a rookie playing in his first game. The 93 yards was the most by any Ram receiver in 2009. His seven receptions in the game was also remarkable, as only teammate Danny Amendola had achieved that many receptions in a single game that season.

Miami Dolphins
On March 15, 2013, Gibson signed with the Miami Dolphins.

New England Patriots
On March 10, 2015, the New England Patriots signed Gibson to a one-year, $825,000 contract. Gibson was placed on injured reserve on August 24, 2015.

Gibson participated in The Spring League in 2017.

References

External links
 St. Louis Rams bio
 Philadelphia Eagles bio
 Washington State Cougars bio
 

1987 births
Living people
Sportspeople from Puyallup, Washington
Players of American football from Washington (state)
American football wide receivers
Washington State Cougars football players
Philadelphia Eagles players
St. Louis Rams players
Miami Dolphins players
New England Patriots players
The Spring League players
Ed Block Courage Award recipients